Blacksburg Motor Company, Inc., also known as Doc Roberts Tire Co. and Heavener Chevrolet, is a historic commercial building located at Blacksburg, Montgomery County, Virginia.  It was built in 1924 and expanded about 1933, and is a two-story brick and poured concrete building with only a single story visible from the front facade.  It features Art Deco and Moderne design details including painted concrete details, rounded corners, and bands of windows with metal frames on the façade and tin ceilings and terrazzo floors on the interior.  The building housed the first auto dealership in Blacksburg.

It was listed on the National Register of Historic Places in 2008.

References

Commercial buildings on the National Register of Historic Places in Virginia
Commercial buildings completed in 1924
Buildings and structures in Blacksburg, Virginia
Art Deco architecture in Virginia
National Register of Historic Places in Montgomery County, Virginia
Auto dealerships on the National Register of Historic Places
Transportation buildings and structures on the National Register of Historic Places in Virginia